"Made in Japan" was an American television play broadcast on March 5, 1959 as part of the CBS television series, Playhouse 90.  The cast included Harry Guardino, E.G. Marshall, and Dean Stockwell. Herbert Hirschman was the director and Leslie Stevens the writer.

Plot
An American soldier in postwar Japan has an affair with a Japanese woman. When he seeks to break it off, she tells him that she broke off her engagement to a Japanese man and that she expects him to do the same with his American fiancee.

Cast
The cast included the following:

 Harry Guardino - Lt. Michael Largo
 E. G. Marshall - Capt. Jules Kilby
 Dean Stockwell - Roy Riverlee
 Robert Vaughn - Earl Randolph
 Nobu McCarthy - Song Mayonaka

Production
The program aired on March 5, 1959, on the CBS television series Playhouse 90. Leslie Stevens was the writer and Herbert Hirschman the director.

References

1959 American television episodes
Playhouse 90 (season 3) episodes
1959 television plays